Penicillium gossypii is a species of the genus of Penicillium.

References

gossypii
Fungi described in 1979